Sićevo is a village in the administrative area of the city of Niš in southern Serbia. According to the 2011 census, the village has a population of 772 people. It lies on a hilltop above the entrance of the Sićevo Gorge of the Nišava River.

References

 

Populated places in Nišava District